Sir Marc Armand Ruffer CMG (29 August 1859 – 15 April 1917) was a Swiss-born British experimental pathologist and bacteriologist. He is considered a pioneer of modern paleopathology.

Family
Ruffer was born in Lyon, as the fifth of nine children of the Swiss banker Alphonse Charles Jacques Ruffer (1819–1896, first Baron de Ruffer) and his wife, Anne Caroline Prieger (1826-1890) from Bad Kreuznach in Germany. The British banker Maurice Ruffer (1857-1935) was Marc Armand Ruffers older brother. 

Ruffer married Alice Mary Greenfield in 1890 and had three children, including Nina Ruffer, who studied anthropology at Somerville College, Oxford and was mentioned by Vera Brittain in the Testament of Youth.

Education
He was educated in Germany and France before attending Brasenose College, Oxford (1878–1881) and reading medicine University College London. He also studied at the Pasteur Institute in Paris under Louis Pasteur.

Career
Ruffer was naturalized as a British citizen in 1890. In 1891, he was appointed the first director of the British Institute of Preventive Medicine, latterly the Lister Institute.

Moving to Egypt for health reasons, Ruffer was appointed a professor of bacteriology at The Faculty of Medicine, Cairo University in 1896, later taking roles on committees dealing with health, disease, and sanitation. In Egypt he worked on the histology of mummies publishing his findings and helping to establish the field of paleopathology.

Ruffer was made a Companion of the Order of St Michael and St George (CMG) in 1905 and knighted in 1916. He also received the Grand Cross of the Ottoman Orders of Osmanieh and the Medjidie, the Order of the Redeemer (2nd class) of Greece, and was Commander (2nd class) in the Order of St Anne of Russia and the Crown of Italy.

He went to Greece during the First World War in capacity as Commissioner of the British Red Cross Society to improve sanitation. Returning to Egypt on board the ship  on 15 April 1917, his ship was torpedoed off the Greek coast near the island of Milos without warning by the German submarine  with the loss of 279 lives, 35 of which were crew.

He was seen twice in the sea, first alive and upright and then floating, believed dead. His body was never recovered from the sea. He was declared legally dead in 1918.

After research by the In from the Cold Project, he was accepted on 17 September 2016 for commemoration by the Commonwealth War Graves Commission on their Mikra Memorial in Kalamaria, Thessaloniki, Greece, to those who have no known grave.

Lady Ruffer died in Alexandria in 1950.

See also
 List of people who disappeared mysteriously at sea

References

Book
 
 

1859 births
1910s missing person cases
1917 deaths
Alumni of Brasenose College, Oxford
Alumni of University College London
British casualties of World War I
British pathologists
Companions of the Order of St Michael and St George
English bacteriologists
Knights Bachelor
Missing person cases in Greece
Paleopathologists
People lost at sea
Swiss emigrants to the United Kingdom